The 2008–09 Canadian Major Indoor Soccer League (CMISL) season sees a different format than previous seasons. As the league has become affiliated with the Professional Arena Soccer League (PASL) in the United States, the Edmonton Drillers and Saskatoon Accelerators will play four soccer games and the Calgary United FC will play eight games against the PASL teams. Edmonton and Saskatoon will play two home games and two road games and Calgary will play four home games and four road games against PASL teams. In the CMISL portion of the schedule each team will play eight games. This will see Edmonton play six home games and two road games, Saskatoon play two home games and six road games and Calgary play six home games and two road games. As a result of the imbalanced schedule, the CMISL announced that all Calgary United FC games against PASL opponents will only be worth one point in the standings. The remainder of Calgary's schedule, as well as the entire Edmonton and Saskatoon schedules are worth two points in the standings.

The playoffs will feature the CMISL champion taking part in an interlocking championship with the winners of the PASL and the winner of the Mexican Liga Mexicana de Futbol Rapido. The CMISL championship will again be a first place versus second place game to be held March 8, 2009 in Calgary.

As the CMISL as become affiliated with the PASL, the CMISL has adopted the rules of the PASL. The most substantial change was the fact that all goals scored are now worth a single point.

Teams

Standings

Regular season schedule

  * Game counted as 4 points in the Standings for Saskatoon, as two other games were canceled in order to play it. Game doubled as the 2008–09 Copa América Final.

Playoff schedule

Canadian Major Indoor Soccer League
Indoor
2009